Jack Shorrock (born 28 April 2007) is an English footballer who plays as a midfielder for  club Port Vale.

Career
Shorrock was at the academies at Manchester City and Blackburn Rovers, and represented the Stockport Schools Football Association (SFA) for two years, before signed with Port Vale after impressing on trial. He became the youngest player in the club's history at the of 15 years and 145 days when he came on as a 75th-minute substitute for David Worrall in a 4–0 victory at Shrewsbury Town in the group stages of the EFL Trophy on 20 September 2022.

Career statistics

References

2007 births
Living people
Footballers from Stockport
English footballers
Association football midfielders
Manchester City F.C. players
Blackburn Rovers F.C. players
Port Vale F.C. players